William Beattie Ramsay (December 12, 1895 – September 30, 1952) was a Canadian ice hockey player. He won an Olympic gold medal as a member of the Toronto Granites ice hockey team that represented Canada in ice hockey at the 1924 Winter Olympics. He later played 43 games in the National Hockey League with the Toronto Maple Leafs during the 1927–28 season.

Ramsay great granddaughter Shannon Woeller is a professional soccer player and represents Canada at international level.

Career statistics

Regular season and playoffs

International

Head Coaching Record

References

External links
 
Database Olympics profile

1895 births
1952 deaths
Ice hockey people from Saskatchewan
Ice hockey players at the 1924 Winter Olympics
Medalists at the 1924 Winter Olympics
Olympic gold medalists for Canada
Olympic ice hockey players of Canada
Olympic medalists in ice hockey
Ontario Hockey Association Senior A League (1890–1979) players
Toronto Maple Leafs players
Toronto Varsity Blues ice hockey players